Hakuryu Sojun Mel Weitsman (July 20, 1929 – January 7, 2021), born Mel Weitsman, was an American Buddhist who was the founder, abbot and guiding teacher of Berkeley Zen Center located in Berkeley, California. Weitsman was a Soto Zen roshi practicing in the lineage of Shunryu Suzuki, having received Dharma transmission in 1984 from Suzuki's son Hoitsu. He was also a co-abbot of the San Francisco Zen Center, where he served from 1988 to 1997. Weitsman was also editor of the book Branching Streams Flow in the Darkness: Zen Talks on the Sandokai, based on talks given by Suzuki on the Sandokai.

Biography
Mel Weitsman was born in Southern California in 1929, to Edward Weitsman and Leah Rosenberg Weitsman. Interested in religion from an early age, he started practicing at the San Francisco Zen Center under Shunryu Suzuki in 1964. He co-founded the Berkeley Zen Center with his teacher in 1967. Suzuki ordained Weitsman as a priest in 1969, and arranged for him to be Shuso (Head Monk) in 1970 under Tatsugami Roshi at Tassajara Zen Mountain Center. His other teachers included Dainin Katagiri Roshi, Kobun Chino Roshi, Ryogen Yoshimura and Kazuaki Tanahashi, with whom he has often worked on translations of Zen texts. In 1984, Weitsman received Dharma transmission from Suzuki Roshi's son and Dharma Heir, Hoitsu Suzuki Roshi, Abbot of Rinso-In Temple in Yaizu, Japan. Installed as Abbot of Berkeley Zen Center in 1985, he later was invited to lead San Francisco Zen Center as co-abbot with Tenshin Reb Anderson from 1988 to 1997, following the eviction of Zen Center's previous abbot, Richard Baker, because of sexual scandal and allegations of financial wrongdoing. He co-founded the American Zen Teachers Association (AZTA) with senior American Dharma teachers Tetsugen Bernard Glassman, Dennis Genpo Merzel and Keido Les Kaye in 1995. Weitsman has entrusted the Dharma to over twenty individuals, including Zenkei Blanche Hartman (1988) and Zoketsu Norman Fischer (1988).

Lineage
 Josho Pat Phelan (?—present)
 Mary Mocine (?—present)
 Myoan Grace Schireson (born 1946)
 Jane Myokaku Schneider (?—present)
 Myosho Baika Andrea Pratt (born 1960)
 Shinshu Roberts (?—present)
 Daijaku Judith Kinst (?—present)
 Soshin Teah Strozer (?—present)
 Chikudo Lew Richmond (?—present)
 Peter Yozen Schneider (?—present)
 Shosan Victoria Austin (?—present)
 Dairyu Michael Wenger (born 1947)
 Darlene Su Rei Cohen (☸ 1942—2011)
 Susan Ji-On Postal (?—present)
 Myozan Dennis Keegan (?—present)
 Horyu Ryotan Cynthia Kear (?—present)
 Sarita Tamayo-Moraga (?—present)
 Mark Lancaster (?—present)
 Marsha Angus (?—present) lay entrustment
 Barent (Last name?) (?—present) lay entrustment
 Jamie Howell (born 1945) lay entrustment
 Hozan Alan Senauke (born 1947)
 Maylie Scott (☸ 1935—2001)
 Fran Tribe (☸)
 Gil Fronsdal (born 1954)
 Edward Espe Brown (born 1945)
 Ryushin Paul Haller (born 1947)
 Myogen Steve Stucky (?—present)
 Steve Weintraub (?—present)
 Zoketsu Norman Fischer (born 1946)
 Do-An Robert Thomas (?—present)
 Shokan Jordan Thorn (?—present)
 Ingen Breen (?—present)
 Bruce Fortin (?—present)
 Arlene Lueck (?—present)
 Daigan Lueck (☸ ?—2015)
 Shinko Rick Slone (?—present)
 Gloria Ann Lee (?—present)
 Myphon Hunt (?—present) retired
 Gyokujun Teishin Layla Smith (born 1946)
 Eihei Peter Levitt (?—present) lay entrustment
 Mick Sopko (?—present) lay entrustment
 Zenkei Blanche Hartman (?—present)
 Kosho McCall (born 1946)
 Seirin Barbara Kohn (?—present) retired
 Gengetsu Jana Drakka (born 1952)
 John Daniel King (☸ 1935—2001)
 Ryumon Hilda Guitierrez Baldoquin (?—present)

See also
Sōtō Zen
Shunryu Suzuki
San Francisco Zen Center
Berkeley Zen Center
Soto Zen Buddhist Association
American Zen Teachers Association
Zen in the United States
Buddhism in the United States
Timeline of Zen Buddhism in the United States

References

Written references

Web-references

Sources

 

San Francisco Zen Center
Soto Zen Buddhists
Zen Buddhist abbots
American Zen Buddhists
Zen Buddhist spiritual teachers
American Jews
1929 births
2021 deaths
People from Long Beach, California
Religious leaders from the San Francisco Bay Area